Eric M. Ghiaciuc [GUY-check] (born May 28, 1981) is a former American football offensive lineman. He was drafted by the Cincinnati Bengals in the fourth round of the 2005 NFL Draft. He played college football at Central Michigan.

Early years
While attending Oxford High School, Ghiaciuc was a three-sport standout in football, wrestling, and track and field. In football, he won All-League, All-County, All-Metro, All-State honors, and he was ranked No.37 prospect by The Detroit News, and No.47 by the Detroit Free Press. In wrestling, he was the state heavyweight champion. Ghiaciuc is of Romanian descent.

College career
At Central Michigan University in Mount Pleasant, Michigan, Ghiaciuc was part of an offensive line which generated 105 touchdowns in a three-year stint. He was redshirted in 2000, saw limited action in 2001, then took over as starting center in 2002, starting for the next 37 games for the Chippewas. He was an Industrial Education major who graduated with a 3.30 GPA.

Professional career

Cincinnati Bengals
Ghiaciuc was selected by the Cincinnati Bengals in the fourth round (119th overall) of the 2005 NFL Draft. Ghiaciuc's college teammate, Adam Kieft, was drafted in the fifth round. Paul Alexander, the Bengals' offensive line coach and assistant head coach, had also attended Central Michigan University. Ghiaciuc made his NFL debut and got his first career start against the Jacksonville Jaguars on October 9, 2005. He went on to play in four more games in his rookie season as a reserve. In 2006, Ghiaciuc started 12 of the final 13 games of the season at center, following an injury to Rich Braham in Week 2. He started in 12 games in 2007 and all 16 games in 2008 for the Bengals.

Kansas City Chiefs
An unrestricted free agent after the 2008 season, Ghiaciuc signed with the Kansas City Chiefs on April 30. He was waived on September 4, 2009.

San Diego Chargers
Ghiaciuc was signed by the San Diego Chargers on December 22, 2009 after center Scott Mruczkowski was placed on injured reserve. He was inactive for the final two games of the Chargers' regular season, as well as their playoff game against the New York Jets. He became a restricted free agent after the season but was not offered a tender by the Chargers.

Cleveland Browns
Ghiaciuc was signed by the Cleveland Browns on April 8, 2010. He was released on June 16, 2010.

Florida Tuskers
Ghiaciuc was a member of the Florida Tuskers' (United Football League) minicamp roster in June 2010.

New England Patriots
Ghiaciuc was signed by the New England Patriots on August 4, 2010. He was released on September 3, during final cuts.

Miami Dolphins
Ghiaciuc was signed by the Miami Dolphins on November 22, 2010 after placing Cory Procter On IR.  Ghiaciuc was released on December 28, 2010.

References

External links
New England Patriots bio
Kansas City Chiefs bio
San Diego Chargers bio

1981 births
Living people
People from Oxford, Michigan
Players of American football from Michigan
American football centers
American football offensive guards
American people of Romanian descent
Central Michigan Chippewas football players
Cincinnati Bengals players
Kansas City Chiefs players
San Diego Chargers players
Cleveland Browns players
Florida Tuskers players
New England Patriots players